Endacantha is a genus of moths in the family Lasiocampidae. The genus was erected by Yves de Lajonquière in 1970.

Species
Endacantha albovirgata de Lajonquière, 1970
Endacantha cleptis Hering, 1928
Endacantha moka de Lajonquière, 1970

References

Lasiocampidae